U.S. Route 441 (US 441) in Florida is a north–south United States Highway. It runs  from Miami in South Florida northwest to the Georgia border north of the Lake City area.

Like all AASHTO designated highways in Florida, US 441 always carries a FDOT designated hidden state road number:

State Road 7 (SR 7) from the US route's southern terminus at US 41/SR 90 in Miami to Southern Boulevard (US 98/SR 80) in Royal Palm Beach.
State Road 80 from SR 7 in Royal Palm Beach to Main Street (SR 15) in Belle Glade.
State Road 15 from Hooker Highway (SR 812/SR 80) in Belle Glade to Narcoosee Road (County Road 15 or CR 15) in St. Cloud.
State Road 500 from the intersection with Irlo Bronson Memorial Highway (US 192) in Holopaw to Bonnie Heath Boulevard (US 27/SR 492) in Ocala.
State Road 25 from North 14th Street (US 27) in Leesburg to the junction with US 41/US 441 Truck in Columbia County, with the following exception:
State Road 25A between the junctions of CR 25 north in Lady Lake and SR 25 south in Belleview.
State Road 25A from US 41/US 441 Truck to CR 25A north in Five Points.
State Road 47 from Duval Street (US 90/SR 10) in Lake City to Georgia State Route 89 at the Georgia state line.

Concurrences with U.S. routes include US 98 from Royal Palm Beach to Okeechobee, within the vicinity of Lake Okeechobee, US 192 between Holopaw and Kissimmee, US 17-92 from Kissimmee to Orlando, SR 44 from Mount Dora to Leesburg, US 27 from Leesburg to Ocala, US 301 from Belleview to near Sparr, and US 41 from High Springs to Lake City.

Route description

Miami to Kissimmee

US 441 begins its northward journey at Southwest 7th and 8th Streets (US 41 both directions) in the east section of the "Little Havana" neighborhood of downtown Miami (both are one-way streets). 441 runs along SW/NW 8th Ave. till it crosses the Miami River; then it runs along NW 7th Ave. till the Golden Glades interchange; then it runs along NW 2nd Ave. till the Miami-Dade/Broward county line.  The route is concurrent with SR 7 from its southern terminus and parallels Interstate 95 (I-95) north out of Miami to western Aventura, where I-95 heads northeast to access Fort Lauderdale and the remainder of the eastern Florida coast. However, the route is soon joined by the tolled Florida's Turnpike and I-95 (Exits 12 and 12C), which follows US 441 north to Royal Palm Beach (ten miles west of West Palm Beach). In between, the route interchanges with the Turnpike at exit 62 via State Road 870 (Commercial Blvd.) in Tamarac. Additionally, US 441 meets Interstate 595 (Exits 8 and 8B) west of Fort Lauderdale and the tolled State Road 869 in Coconut Creek.

At Royal Palm Beach, US 441 intersects U.S. Route 98, ending the concurrency with SR 7, and overlaps the highway through central Palm Beach County, along with hidden State Road 80. Near Twenty Mile Bend SR 700 branches off to the northwest, which is where U.S. Routes 98 and 441 split until 2007. US 98-441 continues west to Belle Glade at the intersection of State Road 15, along the eastern shore of Lake Okeechobee, where SR 80 turns south and US 98-441 turns north to follow the shoreline to Pahokee. Just north of Pahokee in Canal Point, SR 700 rejoins US 98-441 and remains concurrent with US 441 along the eastern edge of the lake. North of Lake Okeechobee in Okeechobee, US 98 splits away from US 441 making a left turn at State Road 70, shortly afterwards the Okeechobee Amtrak station can be found. US 441 continues north, meeting the Turnpike at Yeehaw Junction in Osceola County (via State Road 60). It passes through the community of Kenansville prior to intersecting U.S. Route 192 at Holopaw. US 441 turns west onto US 192, forming an overlap into Kissimmee.

Kissimmee to Mount Dora
At Kissimmee US 441 separates from US 192 and joins US 17/92, here known as the Orange Blossom Trail or OBT.  The OBT starts on US 17/92 at the Polk County/Osceola County line a few miles south of Kissimmee. These names are used throughout Central Florida for the length of US 441 within the region.

Due to its proximity with Walt Disney World and affiliated resorts as well as Sea World, Universal Studios, and others, US 17/US 92/US 441 intersects many toll roads between Kissimmee and Orlando, the first of which is the partially tolled and partial limited-access Osceola Parkway in Kissimmee. Immediately after entering Orange County, it intersects SR 417 (Central Florida GreeneWay) at exit 11. Just north of the intersection the Central Florida Parkway leads to Sea World. Neither of these intersections or interchanges however, compare to the combined interchanges of Florida's Turnpike and SR 528 (Beachline Expressway), in Sky Lake, which contains a series of convoluted interchanges and partial ramps from side roads. North of this interchange, the road passes west of The Florida Mall and intersects SR 482.

In Holden Heights, US 441 has an interchange with I-4 (Exit 80). Eastbound access from I-4 comes from partial cloverleaf ramps, and westbound access comes from a left-turn ramp between the two carriageways that runs under the eastbound lane and merges with the east to southbound ramp before merging with southbound OBT. The interchange provides no south to east access and no west to north access, but such access can found from the intersection with West Michigan Street. Further north the road heads into Orlando and comes to the interchange with SR 408 (East-West Tollway) at exit 9, which is a diamond interchange. After curving around Givens Street and Springdale Road, both of which can only be accessed from West Concord Street, OBT moves closer to a parallel railroad freight line and meets the intersection of SR 50 (Colonial Drive) northwest of downtown. Here, US 17/92 turns east onto State Road 50 while US 441 continues north on the Orange Blossom Trail. North of downtown, US 441 encounters intersections with State Road 438, then State Road 416, and after running along the western edge of Lake Fairview, an intersection with State Road 423 which changes from the north-and-south John Young Parkway to the east-and-west Lee Road.

The road moves away from the freight line north of SR 423, but in Lockhart it runs over a bridge for that line again between Rose Avenue and Beggs Road. Further northwest it runs beneath an interchange with State Road 414, then cuts through a corner of Seminole County and re-enters Orange County in Apopka where it meets the northern terminus of West Orange Trail and the tolled State Road 429 before leaving the Orlando area. This road was intended to be part of the Central Florida GreeneWay loop around the Orlando Metropolitan Area. The road cuts through Plymouth and back to Apopka again, but the last sites in Apopka are Orlando Apopka Airport along the west side and Zellwood Cemetery on the east side before entering Zellwood, Florida. Intersections here include Ponkan Road and then Jones Avenue which lead to another airport known as Bob White Field The road takes a slight reverse curve before the intersection with Sadler Avenue (CR 448), and then approaches Lake Ola in Tangerine, where the road turns straight north.  At the junction with County Road Old 441 (former State Road 500A), US 441 finally loses its designation as the Orange Blossom Trail, then crosses the Orange-Lake County Line and enters Mount Dora. CR Old 441 remains a local downtown street in Mount Dora, but US 441 continues as a rural at-grade four-lane divided highway.

Mount Dora to Sparr
Continuing with the rural surroundings, US 441 maintains its straight north and south position until it curves to the northwest between Lincoln and East Pine Avenues. Approaching Loch Leven, it turns straight west, and then State Road 44 joins US 441 after having run west from New Smyrna Beach and DeLand. This intersection is also shared with County Road 44B, which takes motorists to Downtown Mount Dora. In southern Eustis, US 441-SR 44 encounter another un-numbered interchange with State Road 19 and County Road 19A, taking SR 19 in a wrong way concurrency until it reaches a wye in Tavares, where SR 19 heads south toward Howey-in-the-Hills and Groveland, and County Road Old 441 rejoins US 441. From here, US 441-SR 44 is a six-lane highway with bicycle lanes that squeezes between Lake Harris and Lake Eustis where it crosses over the Dead River on a bridge between the two lakes. The road passes by Leesburg Municipal Airport, then serves as the western terminus of County Road 44, all the while winding around the northern shores of Lake Harris. In Leesburg, SR 44 leaves US 441 heading toward Wildwood, Inverness, and Crystal River, while US 441 curves to the northwest, then intersects U.S. Route 27 in another concurrency, and as a result, the hidden state routes are officially SR 25-500. The concurrency with SR 25 is short-lived, because in Lady Lake, SR 25 branches away as County Road 25. This once served as the southern terminus of the US 27-441 Alternate Route around Lake Weir into Belleview, but still remains a scenic route.

Around the Lake-Marion county border, US 27-441 enters a retirement community known as The Villages. Because of the frequent use of street-legal golf cars in the community, bridges and tunnels for these carts can be found throughout the road. US 27-441 leaves The Villages as it approaches County Road 42, a bi-county east-west scenic route through Central Florida. North of here, it serves as the eastern terminus of a newly constructed bypass to CR 484 in Summerfield. Within Belleview, the road encounters two somewhat important intersections; County Road 25A, and then State Road 35. SR 35 joins US 27-441 in a wrong-way concurrency with SR 500 as the road curves more to the west, until it reaches the intersection with US 301, where SR 35 turns south, and SR 500 becomes the hidden state road for US 27-301-441 for a few blocks. However SR 25 reunites with the triplex at the former eastern terminus of CR 484, and shares a concurrency with SR 25, and US 27-301-441's new secret route becomes SRs 25-500 once again. After that the road curves more to the north again. Near the right of way for the formerly proposed Cross Florida Barge Canal in Santos, the median for the road widens, as it contains supports for a bridge that was never completed once the Canal project was cancelled. Before the median narrows back down to normal again, it intersects CR 328, where a police station exists in the median. To the west of this intersection is the Santos Trail System trailhead of the Cross Florida Greenway.

Before US 27-301-441 enters Ocala, it veers off to the left at an intersection with County Road 464A (Southeast Lake Weir Avenue), a former segment of US 441 that eventually leads to Ocala Union Station. The first major intersection after this is 31st Street. Then it crosses under a railroad bridge before reaching the City Limits and the intersections with the northern terminus of CR 475 and crossing SR 464 (17th Street). US 27-301-441 intersects with SR 200 (becoming the new hidden state road until US 301 reaches US 1-23). The highway reaches the heart of Ocala at the intersection with SR 40 (West Silver Springs Boulevard). After this, the road crosses a railroad bridge west of Ocala Union Station. Five blocks later, it reaches the intersection of SR 492 (Northwest 10th Street) only to move in the opposite direction, leaving the US 301-441 overlap and taking SR 500 with it as they head northwest towards Williston, Perry, Tallahassee, and points north. Before US 301-441 leaves Ocala, it has an intersection with County Road 200A (Northwest 20th Street), which runs east and then north. This road was the former State Road 200A and decommissioned U.S. Route 301 Alternate.

After County Road 464A (North Magnolia Avenue) terminates at the southeast corner of the intersection of US 301-441 and Northwest 28th Street, another county alternate which was a former section of US 441-SR 25 begins on the opposite side. This road is CR 25A (Northwest Gainesville Road), which is also the decommissioned U.S. Route 441 Alternate, and runs northwest through towns such as Zuber, Lowell, and Reddick. East of Zuber, the road intersects SR 326, which originally had a short concurrency, but now directly crosses US 301-441. South of the intersection with CR 329 is an interchange with U.S. Route 441 between Sparr and Lowell, where the US 301-441 concurrency ends. US 301 moves northeast towards Waldo, Starke, and Jacksonville taking SR 200 with it, while US 441 moves northwest.

Reddick to the state line

In Reddick US 441 continues to the northwest, serving as the northern terminus of CR 25A. From there it intersects CR 318, which provides access to I-75 in Irvine to the west and Salt Springs in Ocala National Forest to the east. The road then runs through communities such as Orange Lake and McIntosh, where it passes through the McIntosh Historic District before crossing the Marion-Alachua County Line near the town of Evinston. It passes by a turnoff to Cross Creek before entering Micanopy, then runs across Paynes Prairie Preserve State Park and goes through Gainesville as 13th Street, serving as the eastern edge of the University of Florida campus. After intersecting SR 331 and later SRs 24A-226, State Road 24 joins US 441 in a brief concurrency until it reaches State Road 26 and turns east. US 441 continues north as it becomes the western terminus of State Road 120, then intersects State Road 222 before curving to the northwest and finally joining State Road 20, thereby converting it into an additional hidden state road. At the intersection of SR 121, the DeSoto Trail moves from SR 121 to US 441. In Alachua, US 441 intersects with SR 235, and then runs under an interchange with Interstate 75 (Exit 399), with quarter-cloverleaf interchanges on the northeast and northwest corners.

Just as it did in Leesburg, US 441 in High Springs curves to the right while a state road becomes independent, specifically SR 20, which runs west only to join US 27 as they head towards Perry, Tallahassee, and Niceville. Meanwhile, as it did with US 27 in Leesburg, US 441 joins US 41 north, but here it also serves as the northern terminus of hidden SR 45. US 41-441 crosses the Santa Fe River then runs north passing by O'Leno State Park and River Rise Preserve State Park, near which it shares a brief concurrency with State Road 18. It then runs through Ellsville, where it has another interchange with I-75 (Exit 414), just south of the western terminus of State Road 238.

Entering Lake City, US 441 splits from US 41 onto State Road 25A south of the city. The routes remain parallel, and at the US 90 Lake City Truck Route, Route 441 is joined by State Road 47 which was signed as terminating at US 41. The first intersection within this new hidden route is at U.S. Route 90 (where the DeSoto Trail heads west) to the northern extents of Lake City. Past Lake City, SR 25 branches off to the northwest as County Road 25A, which also shares intersections with CR 250 to the east and Northeast Double Run Road to the northeast. US 441 has an interchange with Interstate 10 (Exit 303), then skirts the western edge of the Okefenokee Swamp and east bank of the Suwannee River as it enters Georgia.

History

From 1956, signs for U.S. Highways in Florida had different colors for each highway. The "shield" for US 441 was brown, until the state was forced by the federal government to conform to standards that required consistent black-and-white signs in 1993.

Between 2007 and 2011, the Florida Department of Transportation rebuilt the NW 7th Avenue Bridge over the Miami River.

Major intersections

Related routes
At least six other special routes of US 441 have existed in Florida, however only two exist today.

U.S. Route 441 Business – Tangerine to Tavares; former Mount Dora Business route, now County Road Old 441.  In Mt. Dora and Tavares, former SR S-500A.
U.S. Route 441 Alternate – Lady Lake to Belleview; former route co-signed with Alternate U.S. Route 27.
U.S. Route 441 Alternate – Ocala to Reddick; Today CR 25A.
U.S. Route 441 Truck – Gainesville
U.S. Route 441 Truck – Lake City

In popular culture
Route 441 is mentioned in the song "American Girl" by Tom Petty and the Heartbreakers.  Tom Petty was a native of Gainesville.

References

External links

US Route 441 in Florida (SouthEastRoads.com)
Old Florida Heritage Highway (Florida Scenic Highways)

 Florida
41-4
41-4
41-4
41-4
41-4
41-4
41-4
41-4
41-4
41-4
41-4
41-4
41-4
41-4
41-4
41-4